Sea-Bow International was a Canadian aircraft manufacturer, based in Valcourt, Quebec. The company was founded by designer Gerald Racicot and specialized in the design and production of powered parachutes. The company was originally called Valmecot, Inc.

The company was founded about 2000 and went out of business in 2015.

The company produced just one aircraft design, the Sea-Bow powered parachute.

Aircraft

References

External links
Official website archives on Archive.org

Defunct aircraft manufacturers of Canada
Powered parachutes